Harold Vivian Marsh Brown (c.1907-1992) was an Australian architect, practising in Mackay, Queensland. Some of his works are now heritage-listed.

Early life 
Harold Vivian Marsh Brown was born in Mackay.  He was educated at the Mackay High School and the Brisbane Technical College from 1926 to 1930.

Architectural career

Brown worked as an articled pupil of Cavanagh & Cavanagh in Brisbane, being registered as an architect in 1930, before establishing his architectural business in Mackay around 1932. In the years to 1940 Brown designed approximately thirteen buildings in Mackay, including a number of fine examples of the Art Deco style.

Significant works 
Brown's significant works include:
 Pioneer Shire Council Building
 Kane & Legge Building in Brisbane Street (his own office)
 Chaseley House
 Imperial Hotel
 the CWA building
 the RSL Memorial Hall in Sydney Street
 Black's Building
 Maguire's Hotel in Wood Street
 The Holy Trinity Anglican Church Rectory and Hall (later the Masonic Club) in Gordon Street
 the Hotel Mackay in Victoria Street
 St Mary's Catholic Church & Presbytery in Mackay South.

References

Attribution 
This Wikipedia article was originally based on "The Queensland heritage register" published by the State of Queensland under CC-BY 3.0 AU licence (accessed on 7 July 2014, archived on 8 October 2014).

Architects from Queensland
1900s births
1992 deaths
People from Mackay, Queensland